Krutoye is a rural locality (a selo) in Starooskolsky District, Belgorod Oblast, Russia. The population was 260 as of 2010. There are 7 streets.

Geography 
Krutoye is located 44 km southeast of Stary Oskol (the district's administrative centre) by road. Glushovka is the nearest rural locality.

References 

Rural localities in Starooskolsky District